The Critérium International de Blida was a cycling race held in Algeria, between 2014 and 2016, which was rated 1.2.

Winners

References

Recurring sporting events established in 2014
Cycle races in Algeria
2014 establishments in Algeria
Recurring sporting events disestablished in 2016
2016 disestablishments in Algeria
UCI Africa Tour races